The High School Affiliated to Shanghai University is the high school affiliated with Shanghai University, located in Baoshan District, Shanghai, near the main campus of the university.

It is a boarding school. The school has 1,697 students and 138 teachers and staff. Its principal is Zhang Xuelin (张雪霖).

References

External links

High schools in Shanghai
Shanghai University